Medawar may refer to:

Jean Medawar (1913–2005), British author, chairman of the Family Planning Association
Joseph Medawar, Lebanese-American film producer and banker
Mardi Oakley Medawar, American novelist of Cherokee descent 
Peter Medawar (1915–1987), Nobel Prize-winning British biologist
Medawar Lecture, a former annual Royal Society lecture 
Medawar Medal, awarded by the British Transplant Society
Medawar zone, the area of problems most likely to produce fruitful results
Pierre Kamel Medawar (1887–1985), bishop in the Melkite church
Medawar, a quarter of Beirut, Lebanon

See also